György Czink (12 November 1939 – 1 May 2018) was a Hungarian sprint canoer who competed in the mid-1960s. He won a bronze medal in the K-4 10000 m event at the 1963 ICF Canoe Sprint World Championships in Jajce.

References

1939 births
2018 deaths
Hungarian male canoeists
ICF Canoe Sprint World Championships medalists in kayak